William the Lion, sometimes styled William I and also known by the nickname Garbh, "the Rough" ( 1142 – 4 December 1214), reigned as King of Scots from 1165 to 1214. His 48-year-long reign was the second longest in Scottish history, and the longest for a Scottish monarch before the Union of the Crowns in 1603.

Early life

William was born around 1142, during the reign of his grandfather King David I of Scotland. His parents were the king's son Henry and Ada de Warenne. William was around 10 years old when his father died in 1152, making his elder brother Malcolm the heir apparent to their grandfather. From his father, William inherited the Earldom of Northumbria. David I died the next year, and William became heir presumptive to the new king, Malcolm IV. In 1157, William lost the Earldom of Northumbria to Henry II of England.

Reign

Malcolm IV did not live for long, and upon his death on 9 December 1165 at age 24, William ascended the throne. The new monarch was crowned on 24 December 1165. In contrast to his deeply religious, frail brother, William was powerfully built, redheaded, and headstrong. He was an effective monarch whose reign was marred by his ill-fated attempts to regain control of his paternal inheritance of Northumbria from the Anglo-Normans.

After his accession to the throne William spent some time at the court of Henry II; then, quarrelling with Henry, he arranged in 1168 the first definite treaty of alliance between France and Scotland.
William was then a key player in the Revolt of 1173–74 against Henry II, which was led by Henry's sons with some short-lived assistance from Louis VII. In 1174, at the Battle of Alnwick, during a raid in support of the revolt, William recklessly charged the English troops himself, shouting, "Now we shall see which of us are good knights!" He was unhorsed and captured by Henry's troops led by Ranulf de Glanvill and taken in chains to Newcastle, then Northampton, and then transferred to Falaise in Normandy. Henry then sent an army to Scotland and occupied it. As ransom and to regain his kingdom, William had to acknowledge Henry as his feudal superior and agree to pay for the cost of the English army's occupation of Scotland by taxing the Scots. The cost was equal to 40,000 Scottish marks (£). The church of Scotland was also subjected to that of England. William acknowledged this by signing the Treaty of Falaise, and was then allowed to return to Scotland. In 1175 he swore fealty to Henry II at York Castle.

The humiliation of the Treaty of Falaise triggered a revolt in Galloway which lasted until 1186, and prompted the construction of a castle at Dumfries. In 1179, meanwhile, William and his brother David personally led a force northwards into Easter Ross, establishing two further castles, north of the Beauly and Cromarty Firths: one on the Black Isle at Ederdour; and the other at Dunkeath, near the mouth of the Cromarty Firth opposite Cromarty. The aim was to discourage the Norse earls of Orkney from expanding beyond Caithness.

A further rising in 1181 involved Donald Meic Uilleim, descendant of King Duncan II. Donald briefly took over Ross; not until his death in 1187 was William able to reclaim Donald's stronghold of Inverness. Further royal expeditions were required in 1197 and 1202 to fully neutralise the Orcadian threat.

William also quarrelled with Pope Alexander III, a quarrel which arose out of a double choice for the vacant bishopric of St Andrews. The king put forward his chaplain, Hugh, while the pope supported the archdeacon, John Scotus, who had been canonically elected. A hostile interchange followed; then after the death of Alexander in 1181 his successor, Lucius III, consented to a compromise by which Hugh got the bishopric and John became bishop of Dunkeld. In 1188 William secured a papal bull which declared that the Church of Scotland was directly subject only to Rome, thus rejecting the claims to supremacy put forward by the English archbishop.

The Treaty of Falaise remained in force for the next fifteen years. Then the English king Richard the Lionheart, needing money to take part in the Third Crusade, agreed to terminate it in return for 10,000 silver marks (£), on 5 December 1189. William then was able to address the turbulent chiefs in the outlying parts of his kingdom. His authority was recognized in Galloway which, hitherto, had been practically independent; he put an end to a formidable insurrection in Moray and Inverness; and a series of campaigns brought the far north, Caithness and Sutherland, under the power of the crown.

William attempted to purchase Northumbria from Richard in 1194, as he had a strong claim over it. However, his offer of 15,000 marks (£) was rejected due to wanting the castles within the lands, which Richard was not willing to give. In 1200, William did homage for Northumbria, not for Scotland, to Richard's successor, John, apparently to save face.

Despite the Scots regaining their independence, Anglo-Scottish relations remained tense during the first decade of the 13th century. In August 1209 King John decided to flex the English muscles by marching a large army to Norham (near Berwick), in order to exploit the flagging leadership of the ageing Scottish monarch. As well as promising a large sum of money, the ailing William agreed to his elder daughters marrying English nobles and, when the treaty was renewed in 1212, John apparently gained the hand of William's only surviving legitimate son, and heir, Alexander, for his eldest daughter, Joan.

Despite continued dependence on English goodwill, William's reign showed much achievement. He threw himself into government with energy and diligently followed the lines laid down by his grandfather, David I. Anglo-French settlements and feudalization were extended, new burghs founded, criminal law clarified, the responsibilities of justices and sheriffs widened, and trade grew. Traditionally, William is credited with founding Arbroath Abbey, the site of the later Declaration of Arbroath. The bishopric of Argyll was established (c.1192) in the same year as papal confirmation of the Scottish church by Pope Celestine III.

William died of natural causes in Stirling in 1214 and lies buried in Arbroath Abbey. His son, Alexander II, succeeded him as king, reigning from 1214 to 1249.

William was not known as "the Lion" during his own lifetime, and the title did not relate to his tenacious character or his military prowess. It was attached to him because of his flag or standard, a red lion rampant with a forked tail (queue fourchée) on a yellow background. This (with the substitution of a 'double tressure fleury counter-fleury' border instead of an orle) went on to become the Royal Banner of Scotland, still used today but quartered with those of England and of Ireland. It became attached to him because the chronicler John of Fordun called him the "Lion of Justice".

Marriage and issue 
Due to the terms of the Treaty of Falaise, Henry II had the right to choose William's bride. As a result, William married Ermengarde de Beaumont, a great-granddaughter of King Henry I of England, at Woodstock Palace in 1186. Edinburgh Castle was her dowry. The marriage was not very successful, and it was many years before she bore him an heir. William and Ermengarde's children were:
 Margaret of Scotland, Countess of Kent (1193–1259), married Hubert de Burgh, 1st Earl of Kent
 Isabella of Scotland, Countess of Norfolk (1195–1263), married Roger Bigod, 4th Earl of Norfolk
 Alexander II of Scotland (1198–1249)
 Marjorie (1200 – 17 November 1244), married Gilbert Marshal, 4th Earl of Pembroke

Out of wedlock, William I had numerous illegitimate children, their descendants being among those who would lay claim to the Scottish crown.

By an unnamed daughter of Adam de Hythus:

 Margaret, married Eustace de Vesci, Lord of Alnwick

By Isabel d'Avenel:
 Robert de London
 Henry de Galightly, father of Patrick Galithly one of the competitors to the crown in 1291
 Ada Fitzwilliam (c. 1164–1200), married Patrick I, Earl of Dunbar (c. 1152 – 1232)
 Aufrica, married William de Say, and whose great-great-grandson Roger de Mandeville was one of the competitors to the crown in 1291
 Isabella Mac William (born c. 1165) married Robert III de Brus (1183) then Robert de Ros (1191), Magna Carta suretor

Notes

Sources 
 Ashley, Mike. Mammoth Book of British Kings and Queens. 1998.
 Magnusson, Magnus. Scotland: Story of a Nation. 2001.

External links 

 William I at the official website of the British monarchy

|-

House of Dunkeld
1140s births
1214 deaths
12th-century Scottish monarchs
13th-century Scottish monarchs
Monarchs taken prisoner in wartime
People from Huntingdon
Earls of Huntingdon (1065 creation)
William

Year of birth uncertain